Jacques "Jacky" Lemée (born 26 June 1946) is a French football manager and former player. He played as a defender for Orléans, Stade Français, Metz, Strasbourg, Angers, Marseille, Laval.

Lemée also enjoyed a career as a manager with Orléans, Châteauroux, Reims, Créteil, Red Star, Limoges, Mulhouse and Angers. In January 2019, he was appointed manager of FC Saint-Jean-le-Blanc.

References

External links
 Player profile at om1899
 

1946 births
Living people
French footballers
Association football defenders
Stade Français (association football) players
FC Metz players
RC Strasbourg Alsace players
Angers SCO players
Olympique de Marseille players
Stade Lavallois players
Ligue 1 players
Ligue 2 players
French football managers
US Orléans managers
LB Châteauroux managers
Stade de Reims managers
US Créteil-Lusitanos managers
Red Star F.C. managers
Limoges FC managers
FC Mulhouse managers
Angers SCO managers
Sportspeople from Eure-et-Loir
Footballers from Centre-Val de Loire